The Trouble with Girls may refer to:
The Trouble with Girls (film), a 1969 film starring Elvis Presley
The Trouble with Girls (comics), published 1987–1993 by Malibu Comics
"The Trouble with Girls" (song), by Scotty McCreery from the album Clear as Day